Asby is a village in Ydre Municipality, Östergötland County. It lies in the traditional province of Östergötland near the arm of the Lake Sommen called Asbyfjärden. According to Svenskt ortnamnslexikon the name of the locality is first attested in 1336 as Aasby, in reference to the drumlin-like ridge the locality is built on.

Sweden's stoutest spruce grows in Asby.

References

Villages in Sweden
Populated places in Ydre Municipality